Charles Magnin (born in Paris, 4 November 1793; died there,7  October 1862) was a French author.

Biography
He received a brilliant education, and in 1813 became assistant in the imperial library, and in 1832 one of the directors of that institution. His theatrical criticisms in Le Globe (1826-1830), his lectures at the Sorbonne (1834-1835) on the origin of the modern stage, and his various writings won for him the praise of Sainte-Beuve, and a seat in the Académie des Inscriptions et Belles-Lettres. Magnin also wrote poetry and plays.

Works
His principal works are:
 Origines du théâtre moderne (1838)
 Causeries et méditations (2 vols., 1843)
 Théâtre de Hroswitha (1845, with text and translation)
 Histoire des marionettes (1852).

Notes

References

1793 births
1862 deaths
French journalists
French theatre critics
19th-century French poets
19th-century French dramatists and playwrights
French librarians
Members of the Académie des Inscriptions et Belles-Lettres
Writers from Paris
19th-century French translators
19th-century French male writers
French male poets
French male non-fiction writers